Breakout is a compilation album by English pop group Swing Out Sister in 2001. Although the album does feature many of the band's singles, it also includes album-only tracks and B-sides.

Track listing

All tracks written by Swing Out Sister, except where noted.

 "Breakout"
 "Fooled by a Smile" (7" Remix)
 "Blue Mood"
 "Communion"
 "Another Lost Weekend" (Edit)
 "Fever"
 "Coney Island Man" (Connell/Drewery)
 "Tainted"
 "Am I the Same Girl" (Record/Sanders)
 "Precious Words" (Connell/Drewery)
 "Between Strangers"
 "Get in Touch with Yourself" (Connell/Drewery/O'Duffy)
 "Who Let The Love Out?" (Connell/Drewery)
 "Circulate" (Connell/Drewery)
 "Notgonnachange" (O'Duffy 7" Mix) (Connell/Drewery/O'Duffy)
 "Wake Me Up When It's Over"
 "Surrender" (7" Remix)
 "The Kaleidoscope Affair" (Connell/Drewery)

Personnel

Swing Out Sister

 Andy Connell - Keyboards
 Corinne Drewery - Lead Vocals

References

2001 greatest hits albums
Swing Out Sister albums